Roc is an American television sitcom which ran on Fox from August 1991 to May 1994.

Series overview

List of episodes

Season 1 (1991–92)

Season 2 (1992–93)
All 25 episodes are aired live to viewers in the Eastern and Central time zones.

Season 3 (1993–94)

Lists of American sitcom episodes